San Pablo de Tiquina is a small town in the La Paz Department in Bolivia. It is the seat of the San Pablo de Tiquina Canton, one of the five cantons of the San Pedro de Tiquina Municipality, the second municipal section of the Manco Kapac Province.

See also 
 Strait of Tiquina

References

 http://www.ine.gob.bo

External links 
 Population data and map of San Pedro de Tiquina Municipality

Populated places in La Paz Department (Bolivia)